Stephen Schwartz (January 1, 1942 – March 17, 2020) was an American pathologist at the University of Washington. He researched vascular biology, investigating the structure of blood vessels and smooth muscle cells. He died from complications brought on by COVID-19 during the COVID-19 pandemic in Seattle.

Biography
Schwartz received a BA in biology from Harvard University in 1963 and a Doctor of Medicine from Boston University in 1967. He started a residency at the University of Washington in 1967, also receiving his Ph.D. in pathology from the institution in 1973. He was the Associate Chief of Pathology at the United States Navy Medical Center from 1973 to 1974.

At the University of Washington, he was an assistant professor of pathology from 1974 to 1979, an associate professor from 1979 to 1984, and then a full professor from 1984 until his death. He was an adjunct professor in the medicine and bioengineering departments. He helped found the North American Vascular Biology Organisation, and create the Earl P. Benditt Award, which he received in 2001.

Schwartz died from COVID-19 on March 17, 2020, at the age of 78.

References 

1942 births
2020 deaths
Place of birth missing
Place of death missing
Deaths from the COVID-19 pandemic in Washington (state)
University of Washington faculty
American pathologists
Harvard College alumni
Boston University School of Medicine alumni
20th-century American physicians
21st-century American physicians
20th-century American biologists
21st-century American biologists